Admiral Sir William Coldingham Masters Nicholson, KCB (28 October 1863 – 9 January 1932) was a Royal Navy officer who went on to be Third Sea Lord and Controller of the Navy.

Naval career
William Nicholson was educated at Stubbington House School. A Commander in the Royal Navy, he was on 10 September 1902 appointed in command of the torpedo gunboat HMS Antelope, serving in home waters.

He served in World War I and, as Captain of HMS Canada, saw action at the Battle of Jutland in 1916. He went on to be Rear Admiral i.e. Second of Command of the 1st Battle Squadron later that year. He was appointed Third Sea Lord and Controller of the Navy in 1919 and was given command of the 2nd Battle Squadron in October 1920. He then became Commander of the 1st Battle Squadron in May 1921.

He lived at Winchcombe in Gloucestershire.

References

1863 births
1932 deaths
Royal Navy admirals of World War I
Knights Commander of the Order of the Bath
Lords of the Admiralty
People educated at Stubbington House School